The pigmented layer of retina or retinal pigment epithelium (RPE) is the pigmented cell layer just outside the neurosensory retina that nourishes retinal visual cells, and is firmly attached to the underlying choroid and overlying retinal visual cells.

History

The RPE was known in the 18th and 19th centuries as the pigmentum nigrum, referring to the observation that the RPE is dark (black in many animals, brown in humans); and as the tapetum nigrum, referring to the observation that in animals with a tapetum lucidum, in the region of the tapetum lucidum the RPE is not pigmented.

Anatomy
The RPE is composed of a single layer of hexagonal cells that are densely packed with pigment granules.

When viewed from the outer surface, these cells are smooth and hexagonal in shape. When seen in section, each cell consists of an outer non-pigmented part containing a large oval nucleus and an inner pigmented portion which extends as a series of straight thread-like processes between the rods, this being especially the case when the eye is exposed to light.

Function
The RPE has several functions, namely, light absorption, epithelial transport, spatial ion buffering, visual cycle, phagocytosis, secretion and immune modulation.
 Light absorption: RPE are responsible for absorbing scattered light. This role is very important for two main reasons, first, to improve the quality of the optical system, second, light is radiation, and it is concentrated by a lens onto the cells of the macula, resulting in a strong concentration of photo-oxidative energy. Melanosomes absorb the scattered light and thus diminish the photo-oxidative stress. The high perfusion of retina brings a high oxygen tension environment. The combination of light and oxygen brings oxidative stress, and RPE has many mechanisms to cope with it.
 Epithelial transport: As mentioned above, RPE compose the outer blood–retinal barrier, the epithelia has tight junctions between the lateral surfaces and implies an isolation of the inner retina from the systemic influences. This is important for the immune privilege (not only as barrier, but with signalling process as well) of eyes, a highly selective transport of substances for a tightly controlled environment. RPE supply nutrients to photoreceptors, control ion homeostasis and eliminate water and metabolites.
 Spatial buffering of ions: Changes in the subretinal space are fast and require a capacitative compensation by RPE many cells are involved in transduction of light and if they are not compensated for, they are no longer excitable and proper transduction would not be possible. The normal transepithelial transport of ions would be too slow to compensate quickly enough for these changes, there are many underlying mechanisms based on the activity of voltage-dependent ion channels add to the basic transepithelial transport of ions.
 Visual cycle: The visual cycle fulfills an essential task of maintaining visual function and needs therefore to be adapted to different visual needs such as vision in darkness or lightness. For this, functional aspects come into play: the storage of retinal and the adaption of the reaction speed. Basically vision at low light intensities requires a lower turn-over rate of the visual cycle whereas during light the turn-over rate is much higher. In the transition from darkness to light suddenly, large amount of 11-cis retinal is required. This comes not directly from the visual cycle but from several retinal pools of retinal binding proteins which are connected to each other by the transportation and reaction steps of the visual cycle.
Phagocytosis of photoreceptor outer segment (POS) membranes: POS are exposed to constant photo-oxidative stress, and they go through constant destruction by it. They are constantly renewed by shedding their end, which RPE then phagocytose and digest.
Secretion: The RPE is an epithelium which closely interacts with photoreceptors on one side but must also be able to interact with cells on the blood side of the epithelium, such as endothelial cells or cells of the immune system. In order to communicate with the neighboring tissues the RPE is able to secrete a large variety of factors and signaling molecules. It secretes ATP, fas-ligand (fas-L), fibroblast growth factors (FGF-1, FGF-2, and FGF-5), transforming growth factor-β (TGF-β), insulin-like growth factor-1 (IGF-1), ciliary neurotrophic factor (CNTF), platelet-derived growth factor (PDGF), vascular endothelial growth factor (VEGF), lens epithelium-derived growth factor (LEDGF), members of the interleukin family, tissue inhibitor of matrix metalloproteinase (TIMP) and pigment epithelium-derived factor (PEDF). Many of these signaling molecules have important physiopathologic roles.
Immune privilege of the eye: The inner eye represents an immune privileged space which is disconnected from the immune system of the blood stream. The immune privilege is supported by the RPE in two ways. First, it represents a mechanical and tight barrier which separates the inner space of the eye from the blood stream. Second, the RPE is able to communicate with the immune system in order to silence immune reaction in the healthy eye or, on the other hand, to activate the immune system in the case of disease.

Pathology
In the eyes of albinos, the cells of this layer contain no pigment. Dysfunction of the RPE is found in age-related macular degeneration and retinitis pigmentosa. RPE are also involved in diabetic retinopathy. Gardner syndrome is characterized by FAP (familial adenomatous polyps), osseous and soft tissue tumors, retinal pigment epithelium hypertrophy and impacted teeth.

See also
 Bruch's membrane
 Drusen
 Fovea centralis
 Fundus (eye)
 Macula of retina

References

Further reading

External links
 
 
 

Human eye anatomy